Stephanitis is a genus of lace bugs in the family Tingidae. There are at least 90 described species in Stephanitis.

Species
These 90 species belong to the genus Stephanitis:

 Stephanitis agaica Drake, 1960
 Stephanitis ambigua Horvath, 1912
 Stephanitis amboinae Drake & Poor, 1941
 Stephanitis anapetes Drake & Ruhoff, 1965
 Stephanitis aperta Horvath, 1912
 Stephanitis assamana Drake & Maa, 1954
 Stephanitis astralis Drake & Poor, 1941
 Stephanitis aucta Drake, 1942
 Stephanitis bankana Drake
 Stephanitis bhutanensis Péricart, 1985
 Stephanitis blatchleyi Drake, 1925
 Stephanitis caucasica Kiritshenko, 1939
 Stephanitis charieis Drake & Mohanasundarum, 1961
 Stephanitis chinensis Drake, 1948
 Stephanitis chlorophana (Fieber, 1861)
 Stephanitis cinnamomae Livingstone & Jeyanthibai, 1994
 Stephanitis colocasiae Horvath, 1912
 Stephanitis decasperni Guilbert, 2006-30
 Stephanitis depressa Blöte, 1945
 Stephanitis desecta Horvath, 1912
 Stephanitis drakei Takeya, 1963
 Stephanitis esakii Takeya, 1931
 Stephanitis exigua Horvath, 1912
 Stephanitis farameae Drake & Hambleton, 1935
 Stephanitis fasciicarina Takeya, 1931
 Stephanitis formosa Horvath, 1912
 Stephanitis gallarum Horváth, 1906
 Stephanitis gracilenta Péricart, 1986
 Stephanitis gressitti Drake, 1948
 Stephanitis hakkodasana Takeya, 1963
 Stephanitis hikosana Drake, 1948
 Stephanitis hiurai Takeya, 1963
 Stephanitis hoberlandti B.Lis, 2002-30
 Stephanitis hydrangeae Drake & Maa, 1955
 Stephanitis illicii Jing, 1989
 Stephanitis indiana Drake
 Stephanitis kardia Drake & Ruhoff, 1960
 Stephanitis kyushuana Drake
 Stephanitis laratana Drake, 1948
 Stephanitis laudata Drake & Poor, 1953
 Stephanitis lauri Rietschel, 2014-01
 Stephanitis ligrya Drake, 1960
 Stephanitis ligyra Drake, 1960
 Stephanitis luzonana Drake, 1948
 Stephanitis macaona Drake, 1948
 Stephanitis macranthai Livingstone & Jeyanthibai, 1994
 Stephanitis matsumurae Horvath, 1912
 Stephanitis mendica Horvath, 1912
 Stephanitis mitrata (Stal, 1858)
 Stephanitis miyamotoi Takeya, 1963
 Stephanitis morimotoi Takeya, 1963
 Stephanitis nashi Esaki & Takeya, 1931
 Stephanitis nitor Drake & Poor, 1937
 Stephanitis nitoris Drake & Poor, 1937
 Stephanitis oberti (Kolenati, 1856)
 Stephanitis olyrae Drake & Hambleton, 1935
 Stephanitis oschanini Vasiliev, 1935
 Stephanitis othnius Drake & Ruhoff, 1965
 Stephanitis outouana Drake & Maa, 1953
 Stephanitis pagana Drake & Maa, 1953
 Stephanitis parana Drake & Hambleton, 1944
 Stephanitis princeps (Distant, 1910)
 Stephanitis propinqua Horvath, 1912
 Stephanitis pyri (Fabricius, 1775)
 Stephanitis pyrioides (Scott, 1874) (azalea lace bug)
 Stephanitis queenslandensis Hacker, 1927
 Stephanitis querca Bergroth, 1924
 Stephanitis rhododendri Horvath, 1905 (rhododendron lace bug)
 Stephanitis rhododrendri Horváth, 1905
 Stephanitis rozanovi Golub & Popov, 2003
 Stephanitis scotti Takeya, 1963
 Stephanitis shintenana Drake
 Stephanitis shirakii Miyamoto, 1964
 Stephanitis sondaica Horvath, 1912
 Stephanitis sordida Distant, 1909
 Stephanitis sparsa Péricart, 1984
 Stephanitis steeleae Drake & Maa, 1954
 Stephanitis subfaciata Horváth, 1912
 Stephanitis subfasciata Horvath, 1912
 Stephanitis suffusa (Distant, 1903)
 Stephanitis svensoni Drake, 1948
 Stephanitis tabidula Horvath, 1912
 Stephanitis takeyai Drake & Maa, 1955 (Andromeda lace bug)
 Stephanitis typica (Distant, 1903)
 Stephanitis veridica Drake, 1948
 Stephanitis vietnamensis Guilbert, 2015-12
 Stephanitis watanabei Takeya, 1963
 Stephanitis wittmeri Péricart, 1985
 Stephanitis yasumatsui Takeya, 1951
 Stephanitis yunnana Drake & Maa, 1955

References

Further reading

External links

 

Tingidae
Articles created by Qbugbot